The 2022 Intermediate League World Series took place from July 31–August 7 in Livermore, California. Danville, California defeated Seoul, South Korea in the championship game, which marked the first time the Host team won. This was the first Intermediate Little League World Series held since the COVID-19 pandemic.

Teams

Results

United States BracketInternational BracketConsolation roundElimination Round'''

References

Intermediate League World Series
Intermediate League World Series
Intermediate League World Series
Intermediate League World Series
Intermediate League World Series